Sonny & Cher were an American pop and entertainment duo in the 1960s and 1970s, made up of husband and wife Sonny Bono and Cher. The couple started their career in the mid-1960s as R&B backing singers for record producer Phil Spector.

The pair first achieved fame with two hit songs in 1965, "Baby Don't Go" and "I Got You Babe". Signing with Atco/Atlantic Records, they released three studio albums in the late 1960s, as well as the soundtrack recordings for two unsuccessful movies, Good Times and Chastity, with Cher contributing vocals to one cut, "Chastity's Song (Band of Thieves)". In 1972, after three years of silence, the couple returned to the studio and released two other albums under the MCA/Kapp Records label.

In the 1970s, they also positioned themselves as media personalities with two top ten TV shows in the US, The Sonny & Cher Comedy Hour and The Sonny & Cher Show. The couple's career as a duo ended in 1975 following their divorce. In the decade they spent together, Sonny and Cher were nominated for two Grammy Awards and sold over 40 million records worldwide. Rolling Stone ranked them No. 18 on its list of the 20 Greatest Duos of All Time.

Performing under her first name, Cher went on to a highly successful career as a solo singer and actress, while Sonny Bono was eventually elected to Congress as a Republican U.S. Representative from California. The two performers were inducted to the Hollywood Walk of Fame in 1998, following Sonny's death in a skiing accident.

Career

1962–1964: The origin
Cherilyn Sarkisian first met Salvatore Bono in a Los Angeles coffee shop in November 1962, when she was sixteen. Eleven years her senior, Bono was working for record producer Phil Spector at Gold Star Studios in Hollywood. The two became best friends, eventual lovers, and were supposedly married in 1964, but Bono says in his autobiography that it was not an official marriage. They were legally wed after their only child, Chaz, was born. Through Bono, Cher started as a session singer, and sang backup on several of Spector's classic recordings, including "Be My Baby" by the Ronettes, "You've Lost That Loving Feeling" by The Righteous Brothers and Darlene Love's "A Fine, Fine Boy". In Darlene Love's recording, the listener can clearly hear Cher and Sonny close to the mic (along with Love, who recorded her own backing vocals).

1965–1966: Career development

With Bono continuing to write, arrange and produce the songs, the couple's first incarnation was as the duo "Caesar and Cleo". They released some singles in 1964, including "The Letter", with Vault Records, and "The Letter", "Do You Wanna Dance" and "Love Is Strange", with Reprise Records.

In September 1964, they released "Baby Don't Go" under the name of Sonny & Cher, which became their first regional hit. The song was later included on the 1965 Reprise compilation Baby Don't Go – Sonny & Cher and Friends, which also included songs from artists such as Bill Medley, The Lettermen and The Blendells.

The duo released their first album Look at Us in the summer of 1965. The album contained the number one single "I Got You Babe". Look at Us peaked at number two on the Billboard chart for eight weeks in the later part of 1965.

The couple appeared on many of the top television shows of the era including The Ed Sullivan Show, American Bandstand, Where The Action Is, Hollywood A Go-Go, Hollywood Palace, Hullabaloo, Beat Club, Shindig!, Ready Steady Go! and Top of the Pops. They also appeared as themselves in the film Wild on the Beach, singing "It's Gonna Rain". On their first album Bono also displayed his political interest long before running for Congress in the lyrics of the song, "The Revolution Kind".

As the followup to the success of Look at Us, they released their second studio album in April 1966, The Wondrous World of Sonny & Chér, which peaked at number 34. The two dressed in animal skins with Bono wearing knee high caveman boots and Cher going barefoot.

During 1965, five of their songs were in US Billboard Top 20, a record passed only by Elvis Presley and behind famous artists like The Beatles, The Rolling Stones and others. Periodic solo releases by Cher continued during this period, including major successes with "Bang Bang (My Baby Shot Me Down)", and Burt Bacharach & Hal David's theme from "Alfie" (as heard in the motion picture Alfie, as well as a single release), both in 1966. Because they sided with the young people being harassed on the Sunset Strip during the Sunset Strip curfew riots; they were removed from their promised position of honor in the Tournament of Roses Parade in January 1967.

1967–1969: Career woes

In 1967, Sonny and Cher released their third album, In Case You're In Love. It peaked at number 45 in the U.S. charts. It contained two hit singles, both written by Bono, "The Beat Goes On" ( 6 on the Billboard Hot 100) and "Little Man" (No. 21 on the Billboard Hot 100).

In an attempt to capitalize on the duo's initial success, Bono speedily arranged a film project for the duo to star in, but the 1967 feature, Good Times, was a major bomb, despite the efforts of fledgling director William Friedkin and co-star George Sanders. After Good Times flopped in 1968, Columbia Pictures immediately sold rights to their intended follow-up film Speedway to MGM. The couple were replaced by Elvis Presley and Nancy Sinatra. In 1969, another film, Chastity, starring Cher, written and produced by Sonny, was also a commercial bomb.

Sonny and Cher's career had stalled by 1968 as album sales quickly dried up. Their gentle, easy-listening pop sound and drug-free life had become unpopular in an era increasingly consumed with the psychedelic rock of the evolving landscape of American pop culture during the late 1960s.

Bono decided to forge ahead, carving a new career for the duo in Las Vegas resorts, where they sharpened their public persona with Cher as the wise-cracking, glamorous singer, and Bono as the good-natured recipient of her insults. In reality, Bono controlled every aspect of their act, from the musical arrangements to the joke-writing. While success was slow to come, their luck improved when network TV talent scouts attended a show, noting their potential appeal for a variety series.

Sonny and Cher also welcomed their first child, Chastity (named after Cher's movie), born on March 4, 1969.

1970–1977: TV success and divorce

In 1970, Sonny and Cher starred in their first television special, The Nitty Gritty Hour, a mixture of slapstick comedy, skits, and live music. The appearance was a critical success, which led to numerous guest spots on other television shows. They also appeared in The New Scooby-Doo Movies as guest stars.

Sonny and Cher caught the eye of CBS head of programming Fred Silverman while guest-hosting The Merv Griffin Show, and Silverman offered the duo their own variety show. The Sonny & Cher Comedy Hour debuted in 1971 as a summer replacement series. The show returned to prime time later that year and was an immediate hit, quickly reaching the Top 10. The show received 15 Emmy Award nominations during its run, winning one for direction, throughout its initial four seasons on CBS. The duo also revived their recording career, releasing the album All I Ever Need Is You, and charting two more top ten hits: "All I Ever Need Is You", and "A Cowboy's Work Is Never Done" in 1972.

Sonny and Cher's dialogues were patterned after the successful nightclub routines of Louis Prima and Keely Smith: the happy-go-lucky husband squelched by a tart remark from the unamused wife. The show featured a stock company of zany comedians, including Teri Garr, Freeman King, Ted Ziegler, Billy Van and Murray Langston (later The Unknown Comic on The Gong Show). One sketch satirizing CBS's detective show Cannon and its portly star William Conrad was so successful that Sonny and Cher staged several follow-ups, with Tony Curtis as "Detective Fat". Everybody in these sketches wore wide-waisted "fat suits" (similar to hoop skirts), so Detective Fat and his clients and his suspects would spend most of the time bumping each other and bouncing across the crowded room.

By the third season of the Sonny & Cher Comedy Hour (1974), the marriage of Sonny and Cher was falling apart; the duo separated later that year. The show imploded, while still rating in the top 10. What followed was a very public divorce (finalized on June 26, 1975). Cher won a Golden Globe Award for Best Performance By an Actress in a Television Series – Musical or Comedy for The Sonny & Cher Comedy Hour in 1974.

Bono launched his own show, The Sonny Comedy Revue, in the fall of 1974, retaining the "Sonny and Cher" troupe of comedians and writers. Cher also announced plans to star in a new variety series of her own. Critics predicted that Bono would be the big winner with a solo comedy vehicle, and held little hope for Cher's more musical showcase. After only six weeks, however, Bono's show was abruptly canceled.

The Cher show debuted as an elaborate, all-star television special on February 16, 1975, featuring Flip Wilson, Bette Midler, and special guest Elton John. Cloris Leachman and Jack Albertson both won Emmy Awards for their appearances as guest-stars a few weeks later, and the series received four additional Emmy nominations that year. The first season ranked in the Top 25 of the year-end ratings.

As a result of the divorce, Sonny and Cher went their separate ways until Cher attended the opening of one of Bono's restaurants in something of a reconciliation. The Sonny & Cher Show returned in 1976, even though they were no longer married (the duo "reunited" with a humorous handshake). After struggling with low ratings through 1977, Sonny and Cher finally parted ways for good. In 1976, Mego Toys also released a line of toys and dolls, in the likeness of Sonny & Cher. The release of these fashion dolls coincided with the popularity of The Sonny & Cher Show.

1978–1999: After Sonny and Cher
Sonny Bono went on to an acting career and later entered politics, eventually becoming a member of the U.S. House of Representatives. Cher went on to become a Grammy Award-winning solo singer and an Academy Award-winning actress.

The couple made two surprise impromptu reunion performances: the first on The Mike Douglas Show in the spring of 1979, singing a medley of "United We Stand" and "Without You", and the second on November 13, 1987, on Late Night with David Letterman where they performed their hit song "I Got You Babe"; it turned out to be the last time the two would perform together.

In early 1999, And the Beat Goes On: The Sonny and Cher Story, directed by David Burton Morris and starring Jay Underwood and Renee Faia, was broadcast on ABC. The TV movie was based on the autobiography of Bono, and focuses on the relationship between the couple during the early 1960s to their divorce in the mid 1970s. This movie was also nominated for two Emmy Awards.

Bono's death, music copyright

On January 5, 1998, Bono died of injuries from hitting a tree while skiing at Heavenly Ski Resort in Lake Tahoe. He was 62 years old. Bono's death came just days after Michael Kennedy died in a similar accident. Bono's widow, Mary, was selected to fill the remainder of his congressional term, and was re-elected in her own right, serving until she was defeated for re-election in 2012. She continues to champion many of her late husband's causes, including the ongoing fight as how to best save the Salton Sea.

The funeral, unbeknownst to Cher, was broadcast live on CNN. She gave a tearful eulogy, after which the attendees sang the song "The Beat Goes On". In front of millions, Cher tearfully and effusively praised Bono, calling him "the most unforgettable character I've ever met". His final resting place is Desert Memorial Park in nearby Cathedral City, California, the same cemetery in which Frank Sinatra was laid to rest later that same year. The epitaph on Bono's headstone reads: "And The Beat Goes On".

In 1998, Sonny and Cher received a star on the Hollywood Walk of Fame for Television. Cher appeared at the event with Mary Bono, who accepted the award on behalf of her late husband. Cher paid tribute to Bono in the CBS special Sonny and Me: Cher Remembers, calling her grief "something I never plan to get over". During the same year, Cher also released her twenty-second album Believe that was highly influenced by Bono's death, and in the booklet Cher wrote "In memory of Son".

When Cher and Bono divorced, they agreed to split revenue from the songs recorded together. When Bono died, one-third of his interest passed to wife Mary Bono, and one-sixth interests were split amongst his children. Cher sued UMG in 2009, claiming she and Bono's heirs were owed $5,000,000 in "hidden" royalties.

Legacy and achievements 
Author Joseph Murrells described Sonny & Cher as "part of the leading exponents of the rock-folk-message type of song, a hybrid combining the beat and instrumentation of rock music with folk lyrics and often lyrics of protest."

The Sonny & Cher Comedy Hour received numerous Emmy nominations; Director Art Fisher won for Outstanding Directing for a Variety Series in 1972. Cher won a Golden Globe Award for Best Actress – Television Series Musical or Comedy in 1974.

Sonny and Cher received the following honors:

 1966: Grammy nomination for Best New Artist
 1972: Grammy nomination for Best Pop Duo/Group Performance
 1998: Received a star on the Hollywood Walk of Fame 
 2015: Ranked No. 18 on Rolling Stone's list of the 20 Greatest Duos of All Time

Filmography

Discography

 Look at Us (1965)
 The Wondrous World of Sonny & Chér (1966)
 In Case You're in Love (1967)
 All I Ever Need Is You (1972)
 Mama Was a Rock and Roll Singer, Papa Used to Write All Her Songs (1974)

See also

Cher
Sonny Bono
Supercouple
List of number-one hits (United States)
List of artists who reached number one on the Billboard Hot 100

Notes

References

Books
Sonny And Cher - Thomas Braun (1978). 
And The Beat Goes On - Sonny Bono (1991). 
The First Time - Cher (1998).

External links 
 Behind the Making of Sonny & Cher: Complete Discography & Recording History to 1970
 The Wondrous World of Sonny & Cher

 Information sites
 
 
 
 

 
+
American pop rock music groups
American musical duos
American pop music groups
Atco Records artists
Atlantic Records artists
Cher
Married couples
MCA Records artists
Musical groups established in 1964
Rock music duos
Sonny Bono
Male–female musical duos
Reprise Records artists
Warner Records artists